Onorio is an Italian male given name. Notable people with this name include:

 Onorio Longhi (1568–1619), Italian architect
 Onorio Marinari (1627–1715), Italian painter
 Onorio Razzolini (1699–1769), Italian settler
 Onorio Ruotolo (1888–1966), Italian sculptor and poet
 Onorio de Verme (1588–1637), Italian bishop

As surname
 Rota Onorio (1919–?), I-Kiribati politician
 Teima Onorio (born 1963), I-Kiribati politician